Emma Beckett may refer to:

Emma Beckett (footballer)
Emma Beckett (netball)